The 2010 Pacific Rim Championships held from 29 April to 2 May 2010 in Melbourne.

Medal Winners

Detail results

Team

Seniors

All-Around

Vault

Uneven Bars

Balance Beam

Floor Exercise

Juniors

All-Around

Vault

Uneven Bars

Balance Beam

Floor Exercise

Medal Count 

2010
Pacific Rim Gymnastics Championships